Reo Nakamura (Japanese: 中村 玲央; born 5 May 1990 in Japan) is a Japanese footballer who plays for AFC Uttara in Bangladesh Premier League.

Career
After playing for Japanese lower league side Osaka, Nakamura played for Western Phnom Penh and Asia Euro University in Cambodia, Lanexang United and VSV United in Laos.

For 2017, he signed for Erchim, the most successful Mongolian team, before joining Indian club George Telegraph S.C.

In the 2019 season, he played professionally for Shan United in the Burmese top flight as well as the AFC Cup. He scored against Persija Jakarta during the 2019 AFC Cup, on 13 March 2019.

References

External links
 Reo Nakamura at Footballdatabase.eu

Japanese footballers
Living people
Association football midfielders
1990 births
Calcutta Football League players
Japanese expatriate sportspeople in Cambodia
Expatriate footballers in Cambodia
Expatriate footballers in Myanmar
Expatriate footballers in Laos